Garfield is an unincorporated community in southeast Oregon County, in the Ozarks of southern Missouri. The community is located adjacent to Missouri Route E, approximately three miles southeast of Couch.

History
A variant name was "Sittonville". A post office called Garfield was established in 1882, and remained in operation until 1906. The community has the name of James A. Garfield, 20th President of the United States.

References

Unincorporated communities in Oregon County, Missouri
Unincorporated communities in Missouri